Amorina is genus of ammonite from the Upper Hauterivian, zone of Pseudothurmannia angulicostata to lower Lower Barremian zone of Coronites darsi. It has probably evolved from Megacrioceratinae and gave rise to genus Mascarellina.

References

Hauterivian life
Barremian life
Early Cretaceous ammonites of Europe